Stage results and recaps of the 2006 Vuelta a España from Stage 1 to Stage 11.

Stages

Stage 1 
Stage 1, 26-08-2006: Málaga - Málaga, 7.2 km. (TTT)

Stage 2 
Stage 2, 27-08-2006: Málaga - Córdoba, 167 km.

Stage 3 
Stage 3, 28-08-2006: Córdoba - Almendralejo, 220 km.

Stage 4 
Stage 4, 29-08-2006: Almendralejo - Cáceres, 142 km.

Stage 5 
Stage 5, 30-08-2006: Plasencia - Estación de Esquí La Covatilla (Béjar), 178 km.

Stage 6 
Stage 6, 31-08-2006: Zamora - León, 155 km.

Stage 7 
Stage 7, 01-09-2006: León - Alto de El Morredero (Ponferrada), 148 km.

Stage 8 
Stage 8, 02-09-2006: Ponferrada - Lugo, 173 km.

Stage 9 
Stage 9, 03-09-2006: A Fonsagrada - Alto de La Cobertoria, 206 km.

Stage 10 
Stage 10, 05-09-2006: Avilés - Museo de Altamira (Santillana del Mar), 190 km.

Stage 11 
Stage 11, 06-09-2006: Torrelavega (Velódromo Oscar Freire) - Burgos, 165 km.

See also
2006 Vuelta a España
2006 Vuelta a España, Stage 12 to Stage 21

References
cyclingnews

2006 Vuelta a España
2006